Dmitry Petrovich Neverovsky (1771–1813) was a Russian military officer and general who served in the Russo-Turkish War and the Napoleonic Wars. He served in the Battle of Smolensk, Battle of Borodino, and Battle of Leipzig, where he was mortally wounded. Born to a minor noble in Poltava, in modern-day Ukraine. He would join the army at 15 years of age.

Life 
Dmitry Neverovsky was born in Poltava, in what is now Ukraine. His father was a middle-ranking official at the time, and Neverovsky grew up alongside fourteen other children. Like many inhabitants of Ukraine at the time, Neverovsky was a fine horseman. Young Neverovsky found a patron in Count Pyotr Zavadovsky, a friend of his father's. Zavadovsky assisted in Neverovsky's education, enabling him to learn Russian and Latin and become a mathematician.

Military career 
His career would start out in the Semyonovsky Life-Guard Regiment in 1786 at 15 years of age. Something of a year later, he would be promoted to the rank of sergeant.

Russo-Turkish War of 1787-1792 
He would fight during the Russo-Turkish war, beginning after his transfer to the Malorossiya or 'Little Russian' Grenadier Regiment, where he was promoted in October of 1787. During his time in the regiment, he would fight at the battle of Salchea and Bender.

Polish-Russian War of 1792 
Under the command of Alexander Suvorov, Neverovsky would participate in the Polish-Russian War of 1792 and then participate in the subsequent Partition. He would engage in 4 known battles, Derevitse, Gorodische, Maciejowice and Praga. The most prestigious of which was Gorodische, where he would be promoted to a captain.

Napoleonic Wars 
In October of 1803, Neverovsky was appointed to the 1st marine battalion as their commander as a colonel. The following year, 1804, he was promoted to a major-general and appointed commander of the 3rd marine regiment, due to the 12 battalions being formed into 4 regiments. Then, Neverovsky served in the Russian army sent to Hannover under Peter Tolstoy (1805) when Russia joined the 3rd coalitionary war and was eventually recalled to Russia. Thus, the humiliating defeat endured at the battle of Austerlitz did not harm his reputation.

In November 1807, Dmitry Neverovsky was appointed as commander of the Pavlovsky Life Guards Regiment, then known as the Pavlovsky Grenadier Regiment. He came to be well-respected due to his character. His honesty, courageousness, generosity and directness earned the trust of his men, and he stood at nearly 2 metres tall, hulking over the rest of the men of the regiment. Dmitry Neverovsky was well-known for his focus on the health of his soldiers and their food, and genuinely cared about the soldiers under him. After discovering the high desertion rates of two companies of the regiment, he ousted the officers, believing them to be cruel, as he was subscribed to the idea that Russian soldiers could only desert if the officers were crude, unjust and altogether too harsh. During his time in the regiment, he opened a regimental school to teach the NCOs to read and write. Part of his contributions to the regiment were improving its accuracy, as he would often host firing drills, partake in them, and would personally see to it that the men maintained their muskets well.

While fighting during the French invasion of Russia, after marching to the Western border 10 days after the wars' start, he was assigned to Bagration's 2nd Western Army and was commander of the 27th Infantry Division, which he had helped organise in the last months of the year prior. Seeing that a French assault upon Smolensk would be disastrous without reinforcements, he ordered Neverovsky to stand his ground near Krasnoi, causing the First Battle of Krasnoi. Dmitry Neverovsky was able to successfully delay Marshal Ney, and the battle of Smolensk would start 2 days later. During the course of the Battle of Borodino, his 27th infantry division fought fiercely within the defensive works of "Bagration's Fleches", suffering a casualty rate of a little under 60% of the division's total numbers. Despite being injured, he remained with his men on the field. For his contributions, he was promoted to the rank of Lieutenant-General. 

He would then go on to fight at the battle of Leipzig, where he obtained the wound that would end him.

Death 
Serving under General Fabian Osten-Sacken's Corps, Neverovsky fought at the battle of Leipzig. During the course of which, a musket ball would shatter his leg, and gangrene would begin to set in. 14 days after the battle of Leipzig, Dmitry Neverovsky would die at Halle, on the 2nd of November. Originally, he was buried at Halle, but his body was moved to Borodino in 1912.

Monuments 
General Dmitry Neverovsky's grave is located in Borodino's fields.

References

1771 births
1813 deaths
Russian commanders of the Napoleonic Wars
Imperial Russian Army generals
Russian people of the Kościuszko Uprising
Recipients of the Order of St. George of the Third Degree
Recipients of the Order of St. Anna, 1st class
Recipients of the Order of St. Vladimir, 2nd class
Recipients of the Order of St. Vladimir, 3rd class
Military personnel of the Russian Empire killed in action
Military personnel killed in the Napoleonic Wars